Douglas Avenue Alternative School is a public alternative high school in Gervais, Oregon, United States. It is located on the campus of Gervais High School.

Academics
In 2008, 60% of the school's seniors received their high school diploma. Of 15 students, 9 graduated, 4 dropped out, and 2 are still in high school.

References

High schools in Marion County, Oregon
Alternative schools in Oregon
Public high schools in Oregon
Gervais, Oregon